Noideattella is a genus of spiders in the family Oonopidae. It was first described in 2012 by Álvarez-Padilla, Ubick & Griswold. , it contains 13 species from Madagascar and related islands.

Species

Noideattella comprises the following species:
Noideattella amboa Álvarez-Padilla, Ubick & Griswold, 2012
Noideattella assumptia (Saaristo, 2001)
Noideattella famafa Álvarez-Padilla, Ubick & Griswold, 2012
Noideattella fantara Álvarez-Padilla, Ubick & Griswold, 2012
Noideattella farihy Álvarez-Padilla, Ubick & Griswold, 2012
Noideattella gamela Álvarez-Padilla, Ubick & Griswold, 2012
Noideattella lakana Álvarez-Padilla, Ubick & Griswold, 2012
Noideattella mamba Álvarez-Padilla, Ubick & Griswold, 2012
Noideattella omby Álvarez-Padilla, Ubick & Griswold, 2015
Noideattella saka Álvarez-Padilla, Ubick & Griswold, 2012
Noideattella sylvnata Álvarez-Padilla, Ubick & Griswold, 2015
Noideattella tany Álvarez-Padilla, Ubick & Griswold, 2012
Noideattella tsiba Álvarez-Padilla, Ubick & Griswold, 2012

References

Oonopidae
Araneomorphae genera
Spiders of Madagascar